Nabagram Amar Chand Kundu College, established in 2009 by renowned social worker Amar Chand Kundu. It is a general degree college of Nabagram in Murshidabad district. It offers undergraduate courses in arts. It is affiliated to  University of Kalyani.

Departments

Arts

Bengali
English 
History
Political Science
Education

See also

References

External links
Nabagram Amar Chand Kundu College
University of Kalyani
University Grants Commission
National Assessment and Accreditation Council

Colleges affiliated to University of Kalyani
Universities and colleges in Murshidabad district
2009 establishments in West Bengal
Educational institutions established in 2009